Antônio Afonso de Miranda (14 April 1920 – 11 October 2021) was a Brazilian prelate of the Roman Catholic Church.

Biography
Afonso de Miranda was born in Cipotânea, Brazil in April 1920. He was ordained a priest on 1 November 1945 in the Congregation of the Sacred Heart of Jesus. He was appointed Bishop of the Diocese of Lorena on 3 November 1971 and was consecrated on 27 December. He was appointed Coadjutor Bishop of the Diocese of Campanha on 11 July 1977. Afonso de Miranda's final appointment was to the Diocese of Taubaté on 6 August 1981, where he served until his retirement on 22 May 1996.

He died on 11 October 2021, at the age of 101.

See also
Roman Catholic Diocese of Taubaté
Roman Catholic Diocese of Campanha
Roman Catholic Diocese of Lorena
Institute of Consecrated Life

References

External links
Catholic-Hierarchy 

1920 births
2021 deaths
20th-century Roman Catholic bishops in Brazil
Brazilian centenarians
Men centenarians
Roman Catholic bishops of Lorena
Roman Catholic bishops of Taubaté
People from Minas Gerais